Montserrat Julió (1929 – 26 January 2017) was a Spanish film and television actress. She died on 26 January 2017 at aged 88.

Partial filmography

 La cárcel de cristal (1957) - Irene Alsuaga
 Sendas marcadas (1957) - Policía
 Cumbres luminosas (Montserrat) (1957) - Madre de Freddie
 A Land for All (1962) - Teresa
 La cuarta ventana (1963) - Adela
 La Tía Tula (1964) - Paquita
 El Diablo también llora (1965) - Carmen Castariega
 The Art of Living (1965) - Ana's Sister
 La visita que no tocó el timbre (1965) - María Luisa
 La Barrera (1966) - Mujer del panadero
 El arte de no casarse (1966)
 Zampo y yo (1966) - Clara - la doncella
 Cuando tú no estás (1966)
 Codo con codo (1967)
 Club de solteros (1967)
 El Baldiri de la costa (1968)
 Susana (1969)
 Chicas de club (1970) - Madre
 Goya, a Story of Solitude (1971)
 Dr. Jekyll y el Hombre Lobo (1972) - Agatha, a party guest (uncredited)
 The Blood Spattered Bride (1972) - Carol's mother
 A Candle for the Devil (1973) - Beatriz
 Horror Rises from the Tomb (1973) - Odile
 Vengeance of the Zombies (1973) - Flora
 Murder in a Blue World (1973) - Presentadora programa cine
 Autopsia (1973) - Mujer de Azcona
 Manolo, la nuit (1973)
 Vida conyugal sana (1974)
 El chulo (1974)
 Sex o no sex (1974) - Madre de Paco
 Tocata y fuga de Lolita (1974) - Adela
 Los nuevos españoles (1974) - Martirio
 No encontré rosas para mi madre (1974) - Amiga de Teresa
 Una abuelita de antes de la guerra (1975)
  (1975) - Cecily Breidlinger
 ¡Ya soy mujer! (1975) - Amelia
 El paranoico (1975) - Vecina de Esther (uncredited)
 Robin and Marian (1976) - 1st Sister
 Batida de raposas (1976) - Secretaria de Leandro
 El segundo poder (1976) - Hermana Portera
 Foul Play (1977) - Alcaldesa
 Tío, ¿de verdad vienen de París? (1977) - Laura
 Impossible Love (1977) - Adela
 Doña Perfecta (1977) - Remedios
 Las truchas (1978)
 Alice in Spanish Wonderland (1978) - Profesora de historia
 La visita del vicio (1978) - Sally
 La ràbia (1978)
 La rebelión de los pájaros (1982)
 Wheels on Meals (1984)
 Puzzle (1986) - Esposa Luis
 Mi general (1987)

References

External links 
 Montserrat Julió at the Association of Catalan Language Writers, AELC.
 

1929 births
2017 deaths
Spanish television actresses
Spanish film actresses
Film actresses from Catalonia
People from Barcelona